Gariz-e Olya (also Romanized as Gārīz-e ‘Olyā; also known as Gārīz-e Bālā, Kārez ‘Arab, Kārīz-e ‘Arab, Kārīz-e Bālā, and Korz ‘Arab) is a village in Garizat Rural District, Nir District, Taft County, Yazd Province, Iran. At the 2006 census, its population was 143, in 42 families.

References 

Populated places in Taft County